Dabhoda is a village in Kheralu Taluka in Mahesana district of Gujarat, India.

References

Villages in Mehsana district